Ambi Ning Vayassaytho is a 2018 Indian Kannada language film directed by Gurudattha Ganiga in his directorial debut. The film features Ambareesh in the lead role, while Sudeepa plays the role of Ambareesh during his young age. It is the last acting assignment of Ambareesh before his death. Actress Suhasini Maniratnam plays lead role opposite Ambareesh, marking their collaboration after 14 years. Sruthi Hariharan, Dileep Raj, Rockline Venkatesh and others play the key supporting roles. The title of this film was suggested by Sudeepa himself. The film is a remake of 2017 Tamil film Pa Paandi which was directed by actor Dhanush.

The film is produced by Jack Manju & KSK Showreel Productions along with Sudeepa's own banner Kiccha Creations. Music for the movie is composed by Arjun Janya whilst the cinematography is by Jebin Jacob and editing by Kiran. Screenplay is written by Sudeepa. The film was released on 27 September 2018 to a positive response from critics.

Plot
Ambi (Ambareesh) is a successful stunt master who lives in Bengaluru with his Son, Daughter-in-law & his 2 grand children. In his younger age Ambi was in love with Nandini. But due to her father's opposition, she had to marry a boy who was chosen of her father's choice.

One day on his way home, Ambi comes across a drug peddling gang and he ends up in a fight where he beats all of them badly. This will turn into a police case and Ambi gets arrested due to the complaint given against him by the drug peddling gang. Knowing this, Ambi's son (Dilip Raj) gets angry on his father for interfering in such conflicts and he later goes on to bail him out of the case. Ambi feels very disappointed with his son's reaction and this will lead to some heated conversation between him and his son.

After this incident, Ambi decides to leave his house & goes on for a solo bike ride to enjoy some lonely time & also to find his lost love Nandini (Suhasini). Will they both get united, will form the crux of the story.

Cast

Production 
Pre-production of this movie began in 2018 with the CG- Computer graphics Work of matching Sudeepa's height for Ambareesh's height for the character of younger Ambareesh. Technicians who have worked for Shah Rukh Khan’s 2015 film Fan have also worked for this movie.

Soundtrack 

Arjun Janya has composed the soundtrack and background music for the film. The soundtrack album consists of five songs. Lyrics for the tracks were written by Yogaraj Bhat, Jogi Prem and Pradyumna Narahalli.

References

External links 
 

2018 films
2010s Kannada-language films
2010s coming-of-age comedy-drama films
Kannada remakes of Tamil films
Films scored by Arjun Janya
Indian coming-of-age comedy-drama films
2018 directorial debut films
2018 comedy films
2018 drama films